French is the second language of Lebanon, with about 45% of the population being Francophone. A law determines the cases in which the French language is to be used within government, and is often used as a prestige language for business, diplomacy and education.

History
The use of the French language is a legacy of the time of the French Crusades and France's colonialism in the region, including its League of Nations mandate over Lebanon following World War I; as of 2004, some 20% of the population used French on a daily basis.

Role and purpose
Formerly under French mandate, independent Republic of Lebanon designates Arabic as the sole official language, while a special law regulates cases when French can be publicly used.

Article 11 of Lebanon's Constitution states that

"Arabic is the official national language. A law determines the cases in which the French language is to be used".

The French language is used on Lebanese pound bank notes, road signs, vehicle registration plates, and on public buildings, alongside Arabic.             

The majority of Lebanese people speak Lebanese Arabic, which is grouped in a larger category called Levantine Arabic, while Modern Standard Arabic is mostly used in magazines, newspapers, and formal broadcast media. Code-switching between Arabic and French is very common.

Almost 40% of Lebanese are considered francophone, and another 15% "partial francophone," and 70% of Lebanon's secondary schools use French as a second language of instruction. By comparison, English is used as a secondary language in 30% of Lebanon's secondary schools. The use of Arabic by Lebanon's educated youth is declining, as they usually prefer to speak in French and, to a lesser extent, English. It is also a reaction to the negativity associated with Arabic since the September 11 attacks.

Attitudes toward French

French and English are secondary languages of Lebanon, with about 40%-45% of the population being Francophone as a second language and 30% Anglophone. In addition to the 40%-45% of Lebanese being considered francophone, there are another 15% who are considered "partial francophone", and 70% of Lebanon's secondary schools use French as a second language of instruction. The use of English is growing in the business and media environment. Out of about 900,000 students, about 500,000 are enrolled in Francophone schools, public or private, in which the teaching of mathematics and scientific subjects is provided in French. Actual usage of French varies depending on the region and social status. One third of high school students educated in French go on to pursue higher education in English-speaking institutions. English is the language of business and communication, with French being an element of social distinction, chosen for its emotional value. In 1997, the Lebanese government committed to a policy of trilingualism in education, including French and English alongside the official Arabic language in the curriculum. L'Orient-Le Jour is a French-language newspaper.

See also
 English language in Lebanon
 France–Lebanon relations
 Geographical distribution of French speakers
 French people in Lebanon
 French language

References

Works cited
 

French
Lebanon